Ronald William Coder (born May 24, 1954) is a former professional American football player who played in five NFL seasons from 1976 to 1980 for the Seattle Seahawks and the St. Louis Cardinals. He was head coach of the Pittsburgh Passion of the Independent Women's Football League. He was born in Savannah, Georgia. Coder graduated in 1972 from Yamato High School in Japan, where his father Ronald Coder, also an athlete, was then stationed as an Air Force pilot.

As of April 23, 2013, Coder assumed the role of head coach of Canon McMillian Senior High School's football team.

References

1954 births
Living people
Players of American football from Savannah, Georgia
Penn State Nittany Lions football players
St. Louis Cardinals (football) players
Seattle Seahawks players
Pittsburgh Steelers players